Christian Rich is an American-born Nigerian production and DJ duo consisting of twins Kehinde Hassan and Taiwo Hassan.

Early life and career
The identical twin brothers were born in Chicago and raised in Nigeria for exposure to their father's Yoruba culture.
By 2013 they contributed to Drake's #1 Billboard album Nothing Was the Same on the intro of "Pound Cake" which features Jay Z and produced “Crawl” for Childish Gambino's Because the Internet.
They produced four tracks for Earl Sweatshirt's #1 Rap Billboard album Doris ("Chum", "Centurion", "Molasses", "Knight"), produced on J. Cole's Platinum, #1 Billboard album Born Sinner ("Sparks Will Fly") and earned a Grammy nomination with Childish Gambino. The brothers produced Vince Staples's big hit “Big Fish” and “Señorita”, Wale/G-Eazy's song “Fashion Week” and Marshmello/Juicy J's “You Can Cry”. They joined Jaden Smith on the joint single “GHOST”. They have production and writing credits with Snoh Aalegra, Juicy J, Anderson Paak and others.

Discography

References

External links 
 

1982 births
Living people
Musical groups from Lagos
Nigerian hip hop DJs
Hip hop duos
Twin musical duos
Midwest hip hop groups
African-American musical groups
Nigerian hip hop groups
American people of Nigerian descent
American twins
Male musical duos
American people of Yoruba descent
Identical twins
Yoruba musicians
African-American DJs
Musicians from Chicago
21st-century African-American people
20th-century African-American people
Record production duos
Songwriting teams